List of chairmen of the Consultative Council of Bahrein.

This is a list of chairmen (speakers) of the Consultative Council of Bahrain:

Sources

Politics of Bahrain
Bahrain

2002 establishments in Bahrain